Aled Thomas (born 2 January 1985) is a Welsh rugby union player. A fly-half, who plays for the Scarlets in the Pro14.

Aled Thomas first joined the Scarlets in 2004, making his first appearance in the Celtic League match against Ulster in Ravenhill.  Following spells playing for Newport Gwent Dragons and London Welsh, He signed for the Scarlets as cover for the 2011 Rugby World Cup .

Thomas has represented Wales at all Junior age group levels and at Sevens level. On 7 March 2009, Thomas was part of the squad that won the 2009 Rugby World Cup Sevens, scoring the winning try in the final against Argentina.

On 24 March 2014, Thomas signed a two-year deal to play for Gloucester Rugby in the Aviva Premiership for the 2014–15 season.

On 13 February 2015, Thomas made a surprise return to the Wales Sevens squad to take part in the 2015 USA Sevens held in Las Vegas, as part of the 2014–15 Sevens World Series.

After one season with Gloucester, Thomas was granted his early release to rejoin his home region Scarlets in Wales for his third spell at the region, from the 2015–16 season.

On 22 April 2015, Thomas was selected for the Barbarians, as they defeated Scottish club Heriot RFC 97–13 in a friendly match, as part of their 125th Anniversary Special for both clubs.

On 17 June 2016, Carmarthen Quins announced that Thomas had been appointed as backs coach.

On 6 May 2017, Thomas took to Twitter to announce his retirement from rugby. It is believed he will continue his coaching career with Carmarthen Quins following the end of his playing career.

References

External links
 
 Scarlets Profile
 Gloucester Rugby Profile
 Wales Sevens Profile
 

1985 births
Living people
Dragons RFC players
London Welsh RFC players
People educated at Bro Myrddin Welsh Comprehensive School
Rugby union players from Carmarthenshire
Scarlets players
Welsh rugby union coaches
Welsh rugby union players